The thin dwarf gecko (Lygodactylus rarus) is a species of gecko endemic to northern Madagascar.

References

Lygodactylus
Reptiles described in 1973
Taxa named by Charles Pierre Blanc
Reptiles of Madagascar
Endemic fauna of Madagascar